Pledge is a cleaning product made by S. C. Johnson & Son. First sold in 1958, it is used to help dust and clean. Pledge is known as Pliz in France, and Blem in Argentina. In several countries, it is sold as Pronto.

Products
 Lemon (odor only) Clean Furniture Spray
 Wipes
 Extra Moisturizing Furniture Spray
 Dust & Allergen Furniture Spray
 Specialty Surfaces Furniture Spray
 Multi Surface Everyday Cleaner
 Multi Surface Antibacterial Everyday Cleaner
 Multi Surface Everyday Wipes
 Multi Surface Everyday Cleaner 99% Natural
 Revitalizing Oil
 Pet Hair Fabric Sweeper
 Multi Surface Duster
 Dust & Allergen Dry Cloths
 4-in-1 Wood Floor Cleaner
 Wood Floor Concentrated Cleaner with Almond Oil
 Wood Floor Finish With Future Shine
 Clean & Shine Multi Surface Floor Cleaner
 4-in-1 tile & Vinyl Floor Cleaner
 Tile & Vinyl Floor Finish with Future Shine
 SC Johnson One Step No Buff Wax
 SC Johnson Paste Wax
 Pronto Liquid Wax
 Wipe & Shine Liquid Polish

See also
 Swiffer

References

External links
 

Products introduced in 1958
Cleaning product brands
Cleaning product components
Cleaning products
S. C. Johnson & Son brands
Reckitt brands